Raigón is a populated centre and suburb of San José de Mayo, capital city of San José Department in southern Uruguay.

Geography
The railroad track Montevideo - San José - Colonia passes through the suburb.

Population
In 2011 Raigón had a population of 738.
 
Source: Instituto Nacional de Estadística de Uruguay

References

External links
INE map of San José de Mayo and Raigón

Populated places in the San José Department